Chārsadda is a town and headquarters of Charsadda District, in the Khyber Pakhtunkhwa province of Pakistan. It is the eighty fifth-largest city of Pakistan, according to 2017 census. The total area of Charsadda District measures about 996 square Km. The district is geographically organized into two primary parts: Hashtnagar (Pashto: Ashnaghar) and Do Aaba (Pashto: Duaba).

History
The earliest archaeological deposits recovered at Charsadda, in Bala Hisar, are dated to ca. 1400 BCE, when a small community was established on a low natural mound of clay above the floodplain of the Kabul and Swat rivers, constructing structures of timber posts slotted into postholes, in association with ceramic sherds and ash. Subsequent periods indicate that more permanent structures were built at Charsadda, including stone-lined pits. Between the 14th century BCE and the 6th century BCE, when an Achaemenid presence is represented at the site (see below), the inhabitants of Charsadda developed an iron-working industry and used ceramics that are typical for this period in the Vale of Peshawar, Swat and Dir.
The later history of Charsadda can be traced back to the 6th century BCE. It was the capital of Gandhara from the 6th century BCE to the 2nd century CE. The ancient name of Charsadda was Pushkalavati.The city hosts the ruins of what was once the ancient Gandharan capital city of Pushkalavati (meaning Lotus City in Sanskrit), and The father of Sanskrit grammar, Pāṇini was from this area and lived around 4th century BCE. Many invaders have ruled over this region during different times of history. These include the Durrani Empire, Alexander the Great's Macedonians, the Mauryas, the Greco-Bactrians, the Indo-Greeks, the Indo-Scythians, the Indo-Parthians, the Kushans, the Huns, the Turks, the Guptas.

Charsadda is contiguous to the town of Prang; and these two places were identified by Alexander Cunningham with the ancient Pushkalāvati, capital of the region at the time of Alexander's invasion, and transliterated as Peukelaus or Peukelaotis by the Greek historians. Its chieftain (Astes), according to Arrian, was killed in defence of one of his strongholds after a prolonged siege by Hephaistion. Ptolemy fixes its site upon the eastern bank of the Suastene or Swat. The region was later conquered by Chandragupta Maurya from the Macedonian straps.

Rivers
There are three rivers flowing in Charsadda: the River Jindi, the Kabul River and the Swat River; these are the main source of irrigation for Charsadda. The three rivers then merge and join the Indus River.

Administration
The district is administratively subdivided into three tehsils – Charsadda, Tangi, and Shabqadar which contained a total of 49 Union Councils.

Education
Bacha Khan University is a public university situated in Charsadda, named after Abdul Ghaffar Khan (Bacha Khan). In January 2016, the university was attacked by gunmen.

See also
 Pushkalavati
پشکلاوتی

References

External links
Blast rocks election rally in Pakistan
Charsadda Portal

Populated places in Charsadda District, Pakistan
History of Pakistan
Cities in Khyber Pakhtunkhwa